The Crown Colony of Malta competed at the 1962 British Empire and Commonwealth Games in Perth, Western Australia, from 22 November to 1 December 1962. In their second appearance at the Games, Malta had a single competitor compete in weightlifting competition.

References

1962
Nations at the 1962 British Empire and Commonwealth Games
British Empire and Commonwealth Games